Eulalia Danuta Zakrzewska-Rolińska (born 6 January 1946) is a Polish sport shooter, sport shooter coach and also engineer. She was an Olympian during the 1968 Summer Olympics in Mexico City and 1972 Summer Olympics in Munich (50 metre rifle prone). Along with Gladys Baldwin (Peru) and Nuria Ortíz (Mexico) she was one of three women to compete in the shooting events at the 1968 Olympics.

Twice a world champion in standard rifle 60 shots prone team and individual (1966) and twice a European champion in standard rifle 60 shots prone team and individual (1971), numerous times Polish champion in shooting (as a junior and senior, during the years of 1961–1985). Twice a world recordist in standard rifle 60 shots prone (598 pts., 1971).

Medal record

References

External links

1946 births
Living people
Polish engineers
Polish female sport shooters
ISSF rifle shooters
Olympic shooters of Poland
Shooters at the 1968 Summer Olympics
Shooters at the 1972 Summer Olympics
People from Zambrów County
Sportspeople from Podlaskie Voivodeship